The Debt of the Dead is an album by the Bloomington, Indiana, folk punk duo Ghost Mice.

Track listing

Since the release of the album, it has been released by Chris Clavin on Bandcamp.com for free.

References

2004 albums
Ghost Mice albums